Paola Bologna (20 August 1898 – 13 January 1960) was an Italian tennis player. She competed in the women's singles event at the 1924 Summer Olympics.

At some point, her married surname became Malfatti di Monte Tretto.

References

External links
 

1898 births
1960 deaths
Italian female tennis players
Olympic tennis players of Italy
Tennis players at the 1924 Summer Olympics
Place of birth missing